Xuân Trường (thị trấn) is the capital of Xuân Trường District, located in the north-east of Nam Định Province in Vietnam. It borders the province of Thái Bình Province in the north, Hải Hậu District in the south, Giao Thủy District in the east, and Trực Ninh District in the west. Xuân Trường is surrounded by three rivers, the Red River, Ninh Cơ River, and So River. Provincial Road no. 489 runs through it.

References

Populated places in Nam Định province